Khok Wua is an intersection in Bangkok. It is a four-way crossroads of Ratchadamnoen (section middle Ratchadamnoen) and Tanao roads in area of Bowon Niwet and Talat Yot sub-districts, Phra Nakhon district within Rattanakosin Island.

The term Khok Wua means "cattle stable" due to the function of this area in the reign of King Nangklao (Rama III), when it was a pasture and grove wood with Hindus cow stables in order to send cow's milk to the nearby Grand Palace. Later in the reign of King Chulalongkorn (Rama V), the stables were demolished and the area became the residences of Muslims who emigrated from southern Thailand. Evidence remains of the earlier residents, including two masjids in nearby Bang Lamphu: Masjid Chakraphong and Masjid Ban Tuk Din.  This area was referred to in comic literature Raden Landai (ระเด่นลันได) with content about the lives of Hindus who lived in the area at that time.

The intersection located on Ratchadamnoen road and nearby Democracy Monument is often used for political gatherings in Thai history, such as October 14 incident (1973), Black May (1992), People's Alliance for Democracy (PAD) protests both in 2006 and 2008,  United Front for Democracy Against Dictatorship (UDD) protests both in 2009 and 2010, People's Democratic Reform Committee (PDRC) protests (2013–14), etc. In the past, it was surrounded by many important buildings such as The Government Lottery Office (GLO), The Public Relations Department, Sala Chaloem Thai Theater, Headquarters Government Savings Bank, Headquarters Thai Thorathat Company (now MCOT) etc.    

At present, there are many places of interest nearby, such as the 14 October 1973 Memorial and Bangkok City Library.

References 

Phra Nakhon district
Road junctions in Bangkok
Streets in Bangkok